An after action review (AAR) is a technique for improving process and execution by analyzing the intended outcome and actual outcome of an action and identifying practices to sustain, and practices to improve or initiate, and then practicing those changes at the next iteration of the action AARs in the formal sense were originally developed by the U.S. Army. Formal AARs are used by all US military services and by many other non-US organizations. Their use has extended to business as a knowledge management tool.

An AAR occurs within a cycle of establishing the leader's intent, planning, preparation, action and review. An AAR is distinct from a de-brief in that it begins with a clear comparison of intended versus actual results achieved. An AAR is forward-looking, with the goal of informing future planning, preparation, and execution of similar actions.  Assigning blame or issuing reprimands is antithetical to the purpose of an AAR.  An AAR is distinct from a post-mortem in its tight focus on participants' own actions; learning from the review is taken forward by the participants. Recommendations for others are not produced.
AARs in larger operations can be cascaded in order to keep each level of the organization focused on its own performance within a particular event or project.

Formal AAR meetings are normally run by a facilitator or trained 'AAR Conductor', and can be chronological reviews or tightly focused on a few key issues selected by the team leader. Short cycle informal AARs are typically run by a team leader or assistant and are very quick.

After action reviews in the military

There are basically two types of military AARs—formal and informal. Formal AARs require more detailed planning, preparation, and resources. They are normally scheduled and conducted as a part of external and internal evaluations. Informal AARs require less planning and preparation than formal AARs and are often on-the-spot reviews of soldier and collective training performance at crew, squad, or platoon level.

Formal

Formal AARs are normally conducted at company level and above. However, when a training event is focused at squad or platoon level, and resources are available, a formal AAR may be conducted to gain maximum training benefit. Externally evaluated lane training, small-unit ARTEPs, and tank and BFV gunnery tables are prime examples. Informal crew, squad, and platoon AARs are held prior to company and higher-echelon AARs.

The AAR facilitator (evaluator or controller) provides a mission and task overview and leads a discussion of events and activities that focuses on the objectives. The discussion with leaders and soldiers should orient on the use of terrain integration of key BOS (Battlefield Operating Systems), and leader actions. The discussion should also examine the weapons systems and doctrine used by the enemy during the exercise. At the close, the AAR leader summarizes comments from the observers, covering strengths and weaknesses discussed during the AAR and what the unit needs to do to fix the weaknesses.

Informal

Informal AARs are usually conducted for soldier and crew-, squad-, and platoon-level training or when resources are not available to conduct a formal review. They are often held for lower echelons prior to a formal company- or higher-level AAR, though they may be conducted at company level. Informal AARs are extremely important since they involve all soldiers and leaders in the participating unit. The formal company AARs for the training event depend on these thorough, informal reviews. These are sometimes referred to as a "hotwash".

Informal AARs are conducted similar to formal AARs and may be done for large or small units. They may be scheduled, or leaders may do on-the-spot reviews during the training. Discussion comments could be recorded to use in follow-on AARs or to apply immediately the lessons learned as the exercise is repeated.

After action reviews in the NHS

In England’s National Health Service, AAR is increasingly used as a learning tool to promote patient safety and improve care, as outlined by Walker et al 2012. In the UK and Europe other healthcare organisations, including pharmaceutical and medical technology businesses such as BD, are beginning to roll out their own AAR programmes.

In 2008 a group of senior leaders within University College London Hospitals NHS Foundation Trust acted on the realization that bullying and blaming behaviours were impacting on safe and effective care. They commissioned the UCLH Education service to tackle the problem, and AAR was chosen as the tool to use.

“Healthcare is dominated by the extreme, the unknown and the very improbable with high impact consequences, conditions that demand leadership, and yet we spend our time focusing on what we know and what we can  control.  Educating  staff on  the  use  of  After  Action  Review enables  team working  and  cues behaviours through allowing an emotional mastery of the moment and learning after doing”. Late Professor Aidan Hallighan UCLH Director of Education

“AARs are applicable to almost any event, clinical or otherwise, and whilst the emphasis is on learning after less than perfect events, AARs after successful experiences can also provide rich benefits. Prerequisite to the success of a formal AAR are a few key ingredients, including a trained ‘conductor’, a suitable safe private environment, allocated time and the assumption of equality of everybody present. Every AAR follows the same structure with the conductor getting agreement for the ground rules at the outset and ensuring everyone is clear about the specific purpose of the AAR and the four apparently simple questions to be used.”

AAR is actively used in a number of NHS organisations including Cambridge University Hospitals, Bedfordshire Hospitals and NEL Healthcare Consulting and has been recommended as an approach to be used in the new NHS Patient Safety Incident Response Framework, which “moves away from reactive and hard-to-define thresholds for ‘Serious Incident’ investigation and towards a proactive approach to learning from incidents.”

See also
 After action report
 Morbidity and mortality conference

References

External links
 Homeland Security Digital Library Leader's Guide to After-Action Reviews (Alternate Title: Army Training Circular 25-20: Leader's Guide to After-Action Reviews).
 UNICEF After Action Review, September 2015

Military education and training